Kim Ove Norum Riksvold (born 26 October 1993) is a Norwegian footballer.

Career
Riksvold started his career at Verdal as a junior, he then moved to Rosenborg in 2011 as a junior. Riksvold signed with Ranheim in 2012. He went on loan to the local club Byåsen in 2013, 2014 and 2015.

Riksvold made his debut for Ranheim in Eliteserien in a 2-2 draw against Vålerenga.

Career statistics

References

1993 births
Living people
People from Verdal
Norwegian footballers
Rosenborg BK players
Byåsen Toppfotball players
Ranheim Fotball players
Norwegian First Division players
Eliteserien players
Association football forwards
Sportspeople from Trøndelag